A list of BlackBerry-related topics

3
3G
4G

A
Accelerometer
Advanced Wireless Services#BlackBerry
ALX (Application Loader File)
Amazon MP3
Appcelerator
Application development
Application programming interface
Application software
ARM architecture

B
Barcode
Bedrock
Biblical software
BlackBerry Alliance Program
BlackBerry App World
BlackBerry Desktop Software
BlackBerry Enterprise Server
BlackBerry Internet Service
BlackBerry Messenger
BlackBerry OS
BlackBerry Planet
BlackBerry PlayBook
BlackBerry Tablet OS
BlackBerry thumb
Bluetooth profile

C
C++
CamelCase
Cloud computing
COD (file format)
Comparison of netbooks
Comparison of smartphones
Computing platform

D
Db4o (object database)
Digital camera
Digital distribution
Digital newspaper technology
Documents To Go
DragonRAD
DriveSafe.ly

E
E-book
Eclipse (software)
Email

F
Adobe Flash Lite
Flash memory
Foursquare (service)
Free software license
Funambol

G
Geolocation
Google Maps
Google Talk
Graphical user interface

H
Handango
HTML5

I
imeem
Inter@ctive Pager
Internet tablet
Iris Browser

J
JAD (file format)
JMango

L
LastPass
List of BlackBerry applications
List of BlackBerry products
List of BlackBerry 10 devices
List of digital distribution platforms for mobile devices
List of operating systems
List of rich web application frameworks
Location awareness
Location-based game
Location-based service
Lotus Domino

M
Microsoft Exchange
MIDP
Mobile app development
Mobile browser
Mobile game
Mobile Internet device (MID)
Mobile operating system
Mobile OS
Multiple phone web based application framework
Mobile TV
Mobile Web
Mobitex
Moblyng
MXit

N
Nettop
Novell GroupWise
NTP, Inc. (Patent litigation)

O
OpenGL ES

P
PaltalkScene
PBKDF2
Personal communicator
Personal digital assistant (PDA)
PhoneGap
PocketMac
Portable media player
Proprietary software
Push e-mail
Push technology

Q
Qik
QNX
QNX4FS
QR Code
Qt (software)
QWERTY

R
Real-time operating system (RTOS)
Reduced instruction set computing
Research In Motion (RIM)

S
Screenshot
SDRAM
Shazam (service)
Skia Graphics Engine
Smartface
Smartphone
SMS
SQLite
SureType
SyncML

T
Tablet computer
Touchscreen
Trackball
Trackpad
Trackwheel
Trapster (speed trap sharing system)
Triangulation
Truphone

U
Unlicensed Mobile Access (UMA)
Ultra-Mobile PC

V
Vlingo
Visual voicemail
Voice dialing

W
Wattpad
WebKit
Wireless
Where.com
WorkLight Mobile Platform

See also
 

BlackBerry
Blackberry OS-related topics